José de la Cuadra (September 3, 1903 – February 27, 1941) was an Ecuadorian social realist writer, whose short stories are among the most important in Ecuadorian literature.

Biography

De la Cuadra was born in Guayaquil on September 3, 1903. His father was Vicente de la Cuadra y Vayas and his mother was Ana Victoria Vargas y Jiménez.

He had an LL.D. from the University of Guayaquil and worked as a diplomat in Argentina and Uruguay.

De la Cuadra was part of the "Guayaquil Group" and wrote many essays, novels, articles and above all, short stories. The "Guayaquil Group" was one of the most recognized literary groups in Ecuador in 1930-1940, which also included the writers Enrique Gil Gilbert, Demetrio Aguilera Malta, Joaquín Gallegos Lara and Alfredo Pareja Diezcanseco.

Some of his works have been filmed by Ecuadorian directors and translated into several languages, including La Tigra and Los Sangurimas.

He died in Guayaquil on February 27, 1941 of a massive brain hemorrhage at the age of 37.

Works
 Olga Catalina (Id. Id., 1925)
 El sabor de la locura (Id. Id., 1925)
 Perlita Lila (Id. Id., 1925)
 Oro de sol (Guayaquil: El Telégrafo, 1925)
 Horno (Guayaquil: Talleres de la Sociedad Filantrópica, 1932)
 Sueño de una noche de Navidad (Guayaquil: Artes Gráficas Senefelder, 1930)
 Repisas (Guayaquil: Artes Gráficas Senefelder, 1931)
 El amor que dormía (1930)
 Madrecita falsa (1923)
 La vuelta de la locura (Madrid: Revista Literaria Novelas y Cuentos, 1932)
 Guásinton: relatos y crónicas (Quito: Talleres Gráficos de Educación, 1938)
 Los Sangurimas (Madrid: Cenit, 1934)
 12 siluetas (Quito: Ed. América, 1934)
 El montuvio ecuatoriano (Buenos Aires: Imán, 1937)
 Obras Completas de José de la Cuadra (Quito: Casa de la Cultura, 1958)
 Los monos enloquecidos (Quito: Casa de la Cultura Ecuatoriana, 1951)

References 

1903 births
1941 deaths
Ecuadorian male short story writers
Ecuadorian short story writers
Ecuadorian male writers
People from Guayaquil
Ecuadorian novelists
University of Guayaquil alumni
20th-century novelists
Male novelists
20th-century short story writers
20th-century male writers